Brookville is a borough in Jefferson County in the U.S. state of Pennsylvania,  northeast of Pittsburgh. As of the 2010 census, the population was 3,933. Founded in 1830, it is the county seat of Jefferson County.

History
The area was initially settled in the late 1790s upon the arrival of brothers Joseph and Andrew Barnett, as well as their brother-in-law Samuel Scott, who together established the first settlement at the confluence of the Sandy Lick and Mill Creeks in the area now known as Port Barnett. The first non-Native American settler of the land within the eventual town limits was Moses Knapp, who built a log house at the confluence of North Fork Creek and Sandy Lick Creek (which form Redbank Creek) in 1801.

The 105th Pennsylvania Infantry Regiment, also known as the Wildcat Regiment, was a volunteer infantry regiment that served in the Union Army during the American Civil War and was raised by Amor A. McKnight of Brookville.  The Regiment fought in several engagements, including Chancellorsville and Spotsylvania Court House.

Brookville's main source of economic development throughout the 19th century was the lumber industry. Brookville's many creeks and its connection to larger rivers (the Clarion to the north, which, like the Redbank, flows to the Allegheny) allowed for extensive construction of lumber mills along the watersheds and the floating of timber to markets in Pittsburgh. The town enjoyed great economic success during the late 19th and early 20th centuries, serving as home to several factories, breweries, an important railroad stop for local coal and timber, and briefly the Twyford Motor Car Company, which operated from 1905 to 1907 and produced the world's first four-wheel drive automobile.

The Brookville Historic District, Brookville Presbyterian Church and Manse, Gray-Taylor House, Joseph E. Hall House, and Phillip Taylor House are listed on the National Register of Historic Places.

Geography

Brookville is located in west-central Jefferson County at  (41.159654, -79.080276), at the confluence of the North Fork and Sandy Lick Creek, forming Redbank Creek, a westward-flowing tributary of the Allegheny River.

U.S. Route 322 (Main Street) passes through the center of town, leading southeast  to Reynoldsville and west  to Clarion. Interstate 80 passes through the northern side of the borough, with access from exits 78 and 81. I-80 leads east  to DuBois and west  to Interstate 79 near Mercer. Pennsylvania Route 28 joins US 322 as Main Street through Brookville, but leads northeast  to Brockway and southwest  to New Bethlehem. Pennsylvania Route 36 leads northwest from Brookville  to Leeper and south  to Punxsutawney.

Brookville is in the Eastern Standard Time zone.

Demographics

As of the 2000 census, there were 4,230 people, 1,849 households, and 1,140 families residing in the borough. The population density was 1,312.6 people per square mile (507.2/km²). There were 1,976 housing units at an average density of 613.2 per square mile (236.9/km²). The racial makeup of the borough was 98.35% White, 0.26% African American, 0.09% Native American, 0.71% Asian, 0.09% from other races, and 0.50% from two or more races. Hispanic or Latino of any race were 0.47% of the population.

There were 1,849 households, out of which 28.0% had children under the age of 18 living with them, 47.0% were married couples living together, 11.5% had a female householder with no husband present, and 38.3% were non-families. 33.9% of all households were made up of individuals, and 18.3% had someone living alone who was 65 years of age or older. The average household size was 2.23 and the average family size was 2.85.

In the borough, the population was spread out, with 22.0% under the age of 18, 8.1% from 18 to 24, 26.1% from 25 to 44, 23.4% from 45 to 64, and 20.5% who were 65 years of age or older. The median age was 41 years. For every 100 females there were 83.8 males. For every 100 females age 18 and over, there were 81.2 males.

The median income for a household in the borough was $30,843, and the median income for a family was $38,438. Males had a median income of $29,940 versus $20,395 for females. The per capita income for the borough was $18,437. About 9.1% of families and 13.2% of the population were below the poverty line, including 25.1% of those under age 18 and 8.4% of those age 65 or over.

Education
Brookville Area School District provides kindergarten through 12th grade public education for the community. The district operates Brookville Area Jr./Sr. High School (7th-12th), Hickory Grove Elementary School (3rd-6th), Pinecreek Elementary School (1st-2nd), and Northside Elementary School (K).  Brookville is also one of four school districts whose students can attend the Jefferson County-DuBois Area Vocational-Technical School (JEFF TECH), a comprehensive career and technical high school and adult education program.

Economy 
The town still supports the lumber industry, but coal extraction has given way to natural gas. It now also features several small and medium-sized businesses and some significant manufacturing operations. Interstate 80, which traverses the United States, was constructed just north of the Brookville borough and continues to stimulate the local economy. Previous businesses include the Pittsburg and Shawmut Railroad. Brookville Equipment is a locomotive and light rail car manufacturer founded in 1918.

The Brookville Historic District is an attraction, and the borough bills itself as the "Gateway to Cook Forest", a state park  to the north. The community's historic preservation efforts have earned Brookville many accolades. Among these are the town's Main Street Project being recognized as having had the longest sustained impact of a Main Street Project in Pennsylvania and in 2012 its selection as a national finalist in the "America's Prettiest Painted Places" competition.

Arts and culture
Brookville has hosted the Western Pennsylvania Laurel Festival since 1957.  The annual event, typically held the third week in June, features a pageant, carnival, parade, food court, craft and sidewalk sales, musical entertainment, and more.

The Jefferson County Fair is held annually in the third week of July just outside of Brookville at the Jefferson County Fairgrounds. Late-November/early-December annually brings the Victorian Christmas Celebration to Brookville's Main Street and surrounding areas.The Moonlite All-American Drive-in Theater operates spring through fall.

The northern trail head of the Redbank Valley Trails begins in Brookville. It is a 51-mile non-motorized, four-season trail that connects to the Armstrong Trail and eventually to the Erie to Pittsburgh Trail Alliance trail, the Great Allegheny Passage to DC trail, and the Passage to the 9-11 Memorial Trail.

The Scripture Rocks Heritage Park] is a free public hiking area maintained and operated by the Jefferson County Historical Society. Here visitors can explore 4.5 acres of a forested hillside on improved trailways that lead to 67 sandstone boulders engraved by Douglas M. Stahlman between 1910 and 1913 as part of his personal religious calling.

Second Strike Lanes is a bowling alley in Brookville that has operated since 1962 under various names.

Media 
Brookville Mirror, newspaper
Mega Rock 105.5, radio

Notable people 
James G. Arner, Pennsylvania judge
Jack Arthurs, businessman and Pennsylvania state legislator
DeVeren Bookwalter, American actor and director
Carl C. Cable, public works engineer
Thomas Canning, composer and music educator
Mal Eason, professional baseball player
James C. Harding, United States Air Force colonel and pilot
Andy Hastings, American football player
Elijah Heath, abolitionist and judge
George A. Jenks, Pennsylvania legislator and United States Solicitor General
Amor A. McKnight, American Civil War officer
Dr. William J. McKnight, physician and Pennsylvania state legislator
Bob Olderman, American football player
Lewis Earle Sandt, the first man to fly across Lake Erie to deliver mail
Bob Shawkey, MLB pitcher, winner of 195 games, 4 time 20 game winner, owned gold mines in Canada
Nathan Smith, American amateur golfer
Albert C. Thompson, American Civil War officer, United States Representative, and U.S. district judge

References

External links

Borough website
Brookville Area Chamber of Commerce

1830 establishments in Pennsylvania
Boroughs in Jefferson County, Pennsylvania
Boroughs in Pennsylvania
County seats in Pennsylvania
Populated places established in 1796